Pramila may refer to:

Pramila Bhatt, Indian cricketer
Pramila Bohidar, Indian member of parliament
Pramila Jayapal, U.S. congresswoman
Pramila (moth), a genus of moths
Pramila or Esther Victoria Abraham, an Indian actress